Horsfieldia discolor is a species of plant in the family Myristicaceae. It is a tree endemic to Borneo.

References

discolor
Endemic flora of Borneo
Trees of Borneo
Data deficient plants
Taxonomy articles created by Polbot